Ardnaglass may refer to:

Ardnaglass, County Antrim, a townland in Northern Ireland, United Kingdom
Ardnaglass, County Donegal, a townland in Ireland